Dmitry Glinka (also transliterated as Dmitri or Dmitriy Glinka) may refer to:

 Dmitry Glinka (politician) (1808–1883), Russian diplomat
 Dmitry Glinka (aviator) (1917–1979), one of the top Allied flying aces of WWII